Andargachew Yelak is an Ethiopian professional footballer who plays as a midfielder for Saint George SC.

International career
In August 2014, coach Mariano Barreto, invited him to be a part of the Ethiopia squad for the 2015 Africa Cup of Nations qualification.

References

Living people
Ethiopian footballers
Ethiopia A' international footballers
2014 African Nations Championship players
1997 births
Place of birth missing (living people)
Association football midfielders
Ethiopia international footballers
Saint George S.C. players